Too Much is Enough (French: Trop c'est assez) is a 1995 Canadian documentary film by Richard Brouillette. The film, Brouillette's first, won the M. Joan Chalmers Award for best Canadian documentary in 1996.

Synopsis 

Too Much is Enough pays homage to Gilles Groulx (1931-1994), considered by many to be one of Quebec's most important and original filmmakers. Groulx's career was cut short in 1981 after he was seriously injured in a car accident. From 1989 to 1994, Richard Brouillette met regularly with Groulx, recording the latter's thoughts on his work and life. Too Much is Enough combines footage from these sessions, excerpts from Groulx's films and interviews Groulx gave while at the peak of his career.

Technical details 

 Producer, Director, Editor: Richard Brouillette
 Scriptwriter and Researcher: Richard Brouillette
 Cinematography: Michel Lamothe
 Sound recording: Claude Beaugrand, Pierre Bertrand, Simon Goulet
 Original music: Éric Morin
 Sound mix: Louis Gignac
 Production and distribution: Les films du passeur
 Format : Colour and Black and White - 16mm - Mono
 Country: Quebec (Canada)
 Language: French
 Genre: documentary
 Running time: 111 minutes

Starring 
 Gilles Groulx
 Jean-Paul Mousseau
 Barbara Ulrich
 Sara Raphaëlle Groulx
 Denis Vanier
 Josée Yvon

Awards 
 M. Joan Chalmers Award for best Canadian documentary (1996)

References

Canadian documentary films
Quebec films
Documentary films about film directors and producers
1995 films
1995 documentary films
Documentary films about the cinema of Canada
French-language Canadian films
1990s Canadian films